Southwick is a suburb in Ooty town.  It is located on the NH 67 road from Ooty to Coonoor at about 3 km from the bus stand in Ooty.  The suburb falls within the Ooty municipality in Tamil Nadu, India. It has derived its name from the Southwick Bungalow in the suburb.

Establishments

Government organisations
Nilgiris District Co-Operative Milk Producers' Union Limited: This union was established on 14 July 1946. It has members throughout the district, from whom it collects milk and supplies it to customers. The establishment  also has a cheese manufacturing facility within the premises.

Nehru Yuva Kendra: Nehru Yuva Kendra Sangathan (NYKS) is an autonomous organization under the Ministry of Youth Affairs and Sports of the Government of India. The organisation has youth clubs which undergo training and education. The other activities of the youth club include sports, adventure programmes, entrepreneurship development, self-employment, awareness generation, skill development etc.

Private Establishments
Wax World: Wax world is a wax museum and art gallery, which has life size statues of wax which demonstrates Indian history, heritage and culture. The wax statues are displayed in a 142-year-old bungalow.
The Eye Foundation
DCIS

TANSI Watch Assembly Unit: This watch assembly unit was incorporated in the year 1978. It began to assemble watches from 1 August 1978. The  required raw materials are supplied by the Hindustan Machine Tools (H.M.T).

List of Hotels in Southwick
 Hotel Blue Bird
 Hotel Pebrock Heritage Inn
 Hotel Moti Manor
 Silver Oaks Cottages
 Hotel Orchid Inn

Image gallery

See also
 Government Botanical Gardens, Udagamandalam
 Government Rose Garden, Ooty
 Kamaraj Sagar Dam
 Mariamman temple, Ooty
 Ooty Golf Course
 Ooty Lake
 Ooty Radio Telescope
 St. Stephen's Church, Ooty
 Stone House, Ooty

References

External links

 Ooty / Udhagai / Udhagamandalam / Oootacamund Official history and tourism page on www.nilgiris.tn.gov.in. (This site is maintained by the District Administration of the Nilgiris)

Geography of Ooty
Neighbourhoods in Tamil Nadu